= United Arabia =

United Arabia may refer to:

- United Arab Emirates
- United Arab Republic
- Pan-Arabism
